Santi Wilson Debriano (born 1955 in Panama) is a jazz bassist.

Debriano was raised in Brooklyn, having moved there with his family at age four. He studied composition at Union College in New York, then attended the New England Conservatory of Music and Wesleyan University. He worked with Archie Shepp in the late 1970s and early 1980s, then moved to Paris and played with Sam Rivers for three years. He returned to New York City and has since worked with Don Pullen, Pharoah Sanders, Sonny Fortune, Billy Hart, Larry Coryell, Chucho Valdés, Hank Jones, Cecil Taylor, Randy Weston, Freddie Hubbard, Kirk Lightsey,  and Attila Zoller.

Debriano has led several of his own units, including small groups in the late 1980s and Circlechant, a world music-influenced ensemble which has had among its members Helio Alves, Will Calhoun, and Abraham Burton.

Debriano was also the music director for arts at Dwight Morrow High School in Englewood, New Jersey, and was given an award for jazz education by New York University in 2001.

Discography

As leader
 Obeah (1987, Freelance)
 Soldiers of Fortune (Freelance, 1989)
 Panamaniacs (Evidence, 1997)
 Circlechant (HighNote, 1999)
 Artistic License (Savant, 2001)
 3-Ololy (Bellaphon, 2006)
 Flash of the Spirit (Truth Revolution Records, 2021)

As sideman
Bill Barron: Live at Cobi's (SteepleChase, 1988-89 [2005])
Larry Coryell: Monk, Trane, Miles & Me (HighNote, 1999)
Larry Coryell: Inner Urge (HighNote, 2001)
 Stanley Cowell: Back to the Beautiful (Concord, 1989)
 Sonny Fortune: Four in One (Blue Note, 1994), From Now On (Blue Note, 1996)
 Chico Freeman: Focus (Contemporary, 1994)
 Billy Hart: Amethyst (Arabesque, 1993), Oceans of Time (Arabesque, 1997)
 Louis Hayes: Louis at Large (Sharp Nine, 1996)
 Oliver Lake: Compilation (Gramavision, 1982–86)
 Oliver Lake: Virtual Reality (Total Escapism) (Gazell, 1992)
 Kirk Lightsey: Kirk 'n Marcus (Criss Cross Jazz, 1987) with Marcus Belgrave
 Charles McPherson: Come Play with Me (Arabesque, 1995)
 David Murray: Black & Black (DIW, 1991)
 David Murray: Long Goodbye: A Tribute to Don Pullen (DIW, 1996)
 Jim Pepper: Dakota Sound (Enja, 1987)
 Charlie Rouse: Soul Mates (Uptown, 1988 [1993]) featuring Sahib Shihab
 Archie Shepp: Soul Song (Enja, 1982)
 Bob Thiele Collective: Louis Satchmo (1991)
 Larry Willis: Let's Play (SteepleChase, 1991)
 New York Unit: Tribute to George Adams (Paddle Wheel, 1992)

References
Craig Harris, [ Santi Debriano] at Allmusic

1955 births
Living people
American jazz double-bassists
Male double-bassists
Wesleyan University alumni
HighNote Records artists
21st-century double-bassists
21st-century American male musicians
American male jazz musicians
Motéma Music artists
Mapleshade Records artists